The 1986 Temple Owls football team was an American football team that represented Temple University as an independent during the 1986 NCAA Division I-A football season. In its fourth season under head coach Bruce Arians, the team compiled a 6–5 record and outscored opponents by a total of 308 to 271. The team played its home games at Veterans Stadium in Philadelphia. 

The team's statistical leaders included Lee Saltz with 1,729 passing yards, Paul Palmer with 1,866 rushing yards and 90 points scored, and Keith Gloster with 568 receiving yards.

Schedule

References

Temple
Temple Owls football seasons
Temple Owls football